Sara Scott Griffith (born 28 June 1966) is a Scottish actress. She played Stella in Sugar Rush.

Early life
Stewart was born in Edinburgh, Scotland, to American parents. After spending some time in the U.S., she trained at the Central School of Speech and Drama, and has made London her home.

Career

Theatre
Stewart's theatre credits include: Noël Coward's Present Laughter (2007–2008) and The Hour We Knew Nothing of Each Other at the National Theatre, London, Natalya Petrovna in Ivan Turgenev's A Month in the Country for the RSC, The Pain and the Itch (2007) at the Royal Court, London, and Proof (2002) at the Donmar Warehouse, London.

Television
On television, she has starred in programmes such as: Taggart in 1992 as Alison Bain, a TV journalist appearing alongside Mark McManus in Ring of Deceit, Wire in the Blood, Life Begins, Monarch of the Glen, Rebus, NCS: Manhunt, Auf Wiedersehen, Pet as Heather Lane, Mayo, as Hope Hendrick, Holby City as Kathryn MacKenzie, A Touch of Frost as Martine Phillips, New Tricks as Lulu Questor, The House of Eliott as Francine Bailey. She appeared as 'Susie' in a 1993 episode of Minder. Stewart played the role of the production assistant, Jenny, in the first series of Drop the Dead Donkey.  In the fifth episode of the second series of Doctor Finlay, she played the part of Jean Geddie. She also appeared in a single episode of the BBC hit comedy Men Behaving Badly as a friend of Deborah, in the episode of Waking the Dead, Towers of Silence and in the episode of Hetty Wainthropp Investigates series 3, "Helping Hansi" (1998).

She appeared in two Midsomer Murders episodes; “Death In Chorus” (2006) as Carolyn Armitage and “The Flying Club” (2014) as Miranda Darnley.

Sara played the Sheriff of Nottingham's sister, Davina, in Sister Hood, the opening episode of Season 2 of Robin Hood (2007). Her most recent roles were as Stella in the hit 2005 TV series, Sugar Rush, and as a transgender character Gaynor in an episode of the BBC drama Ashes to Ashes. She has been seen at Patricia in the Sky1 adaptation of Martina Cole's The Take. In 2011 and 2012 Stewart played Professor Jean Shales in series 1 and 2 of the Channel 4 comedy series Fresh Meat.  Her voice appears in the Dr Who episode "The End of the World". In 2014 she appeared in Quirke as Rose. In 2014, she appeared as a QC in an episode of EastEnders. She played American journalist Winifred Bonfils Black in ITV's 2013 Mr Selfridge, and Susie Parks in the 2017 BBC One drama TV series Doctor Foster (episodes 1–2, 4–5).

In 2018, she appeared as Professor Ariane Cornell in an episode of Casualty. An associate of Connie Beauchamp, Cornell is involved in removing a cancerous tumor from her heart and saving her life. Stewart later appeared as Cornell in two episodes of Holby City.  She played Mel Hollis in series 3 of ITV's Unforgotten.

In 2020, she appeared in episode 3.3 "The Sticking Place" of the BBC TV series Shakespeare & Hathaway: Private Investigators.

In 2022, she appeared as Lady Margot Hawthorne in episode 9.6 "The New Order" of the BBC TV series Father Brown.

Film
Her work in film includes: The Road to Guantanamo, A Cock and Bull Story, Batman Begins (as Martha Wayne), London Voodoo, The Winslow Boy and Mrs. Brown.

Personal life
She holds dual citizenship for the UK and the US. Now based in Twickenham, she was married to actor Aden Gillett. They have two children, son Sam and daughter India. She was later in a relationship with actor Mark Powley. She had surgery for breast cancer in 2011, and advocates for causes that promote awareness of and fighting the disease.

References

External links
 

1966 births
Alumni of the Royal Central School of Speech and Drama
Living people
Actresses from Edinburgh
Scottish people of American descent
Scottish film actresses
Scottish television actresses
20th-century Scottish actresses
21st-century Scottish actresses
American film actresses
American television actresses
20th-century American actresses
21st-century American actresses